Jesse Martin Combs (July 7, 1889 – August 21, 1953) was a U.S. Representative from Texas.

Born in Center, Texas, Combs attended the public schools and graduated from Southwest Texas State Teachers College in 1912. He was admitted to the bar in 1918 and commenced practice in Kountze, Texas. He served as
county judge of Hardin County, Texas (1919–1920). He served as district judge of the Seventy-fifth district (1923–1925). He served as associate justice of the ninth court of civil appeals (1933–1943). He served as member and president of the board of trustees of South Park Schools (1926–1940). He served as president of the board of trustees of Lamar College (1940–1944).

Combs was elected as a Democrat to the Seventy-ninth and to the three succeeding Congresses (January 3, 1945 – January 3, 1953). He was not a candidate for renomination in 1952. He was succeeded by Jack Brooks. He returned to Beaumont, Texas, where he died August 21, 1953. He was interred in Magnolia Cemetery.

References

1889 births
1953 deaths
County judges in Texas
Texas state court judges
Democratic Party members of the United States House of Representatives from Texas
20th-century American politicians
People from Center, Texas
People from Kountze, Texas
Texas State University alumni
20th-century American judges